The Federation of Private Services (FSP) was a trade union representing workers in various service industries in Spain.

The union was established in 1984, as the Federation of Diverse Activities, and it affiliated to the Workers' Commissions.  At its first conference, the following year, it established sectors for workers in the following industries:

 Cleaning
 Private security
 Urban sanitation
 Home care services
 Domestic work
 Dry cleaning and laundries
 Disinfection and extermination
 Recycling
 Phone booth maintenance
 Maintenance of markets
 Porters
 Hairdressing
 Other ancillary industries

By 1994, the union had 31,681 members.  It adopted its final name in 2013, and the following year, it merged with the Federation of Construction, Wood and Related Industries, to form the Federation of Construction and Services.

References

Trade unions established in 1984
Trade unions disestablished in 2014
Trade unions in Spain